Anda Ka Kasam (அண்டாகாகசம்) is a 2022 Indian-Tamil-language reality television Game show airs on Star Vijay and streamed on Disney+ Hotstar. It premiered on 14 August 2022, and aired on every Sunday at 1:30PM. The show is hosted by Ma Ka Pa Anand. During the show, two celebrity teams with 3 members participating in the show in three rounds- film-based quiz, A collage with various items is displayed on the screen and Manthiraarai (Gift Room).

The show first season was ended with 26 Episode from 12 February 2023.

Host
 Ma Ka Pa Anand
 Tamil actor and television presenter who has been working with Star Vijay.

Overview

Episodes

References

External links
 Anda Ka Kasam at Disney+ Hotstar

Star Vijay original programming
Tamil-language television shows
Tamil-language game shows
Tamil-language quiz shows
Tamil-language reality television series
2022 Tamil-language television series debuts
Television shows set in Tamil Nadu
2023 Tamil-language television series endings